End around can have several meanings:
The end-around, a type of trick play in American football
End Around (submarine tactic), used in World War II